Andrei Daniel Marinescu (born February 11, 1985) is a Romanian football player. He plays as a goalkeeper. In his career, Marinescu also played for teams such as Rapid București, Alro Slatina, CS Turnu Severin, Academica Clinceni or CS Afumați, among others.

References

External links
 
 

1985 births
Living people
Footballers from Bucharest
Romanian footballers
Association football goalkeepers
Liga I players
Liga II players
FC Rapid București players
FC Petrolul Ploiești players
CS Turnu Severin players
FC Brașov (1936) players
LPS HD Clinceni players
CS Gaz Metan Mediaș players
CS Afumați players
CS Sportul Snagov players
CS Universitatea Craiova players